Nauhea is a monotypic genus of South Pacific ground spiders containing the single species, Nauhea tapa. It was first described by Raymond Robert Forster in 1979, and has only been found in New Zealand.

References

Gnaphosidae
Spiders described in 1979
Spiders of New Zealand
Taxa named by Raymond Robert Forster